My Arms, Your Hearse is the third full-length studio album by Swedish progressive metal band Opeth, released in August 1998. It was the band's first album to be released simultaneously in Europe, through Candlelight Records, and in the United States, through Century Black.

Background
My Arms, Your Hearse was the first Opeth album with drummer Martin Lopez, who answered a newspaper ad that Opeth put up searching for this spot to be taken after Anders Nordin left. Shortly thereafter the band also brought in Martín Méndez, a friend and previous bandmate of Lopez. However, Mendez did not have enough time to learn the bass parts for the album, so frontman Mikael Åkerfeldt played bass for the entire recording session. All of the songs on My Arms, Your Hearse are shorter than ten minutes, whereas on Opeth's previous album, Morningrise, every song exceeds this length. The album is dedicated to Lee Barrett (of Candlelight Records).

The title of the album is derived from the lyrics of the song "Drip, Drip" by the band Comus.

Concept
Åkerfeldt wrote all the lyrics before the music was written, to create Opeth's first concept album. Each song ends with the title of the next song. For example, “April Ethereal” ends with the word “when”, which is the name of the next track.

Artwork 
The cover of this album was captured by their guitarist (at the time) Peter Lindgren. The original picture was taken in late 1997, somewhere in Sweden. The effects were added later on. The figure seen in the middle is Lindgren's girlfriend in a costume with makeup on.

Reception

My Arms, Your Hearse was widely praised by critics. Steve Huey of AllMusic said that it "flows logically from one composition to the next, and the mostly long songs have enough variation in texture and mood to hold the listener's interest fairly consistently". Jeb of Metal Faith magazine said, "each song sort of flows into the next giving the whole album a unified feel". Jeff of Mid West Metal magazine commented, "having never been exposed to Opeth, I had them pegged as a typical black metal bands that sings about love and relationships and crap like that. I really didn't expect to get blown out of the water when 'April Ethereal' kicked in, from this point I am converted! And while the album has some mellow parts and some folk-ish characteristics, it's still a very intense album from a band who seems to have not forgotten how the fuck they got their current plateau in life." Christian Renner of Metal Crypt wrote, "the musicianship is brilliant as always and the songwriting is just what you would expect from this incredibly talented group. This is another great album that most bands out there would give their right arm to have written and that statement just speaks volumes of the songwriting talent of the Åkerfeldt/Lindgren team." Pedro Azevedo of Chronicles of Chaos said of the album, "though some parts of the drum sound are somewhat awkward at times (new drummer and bass player, by the way), the instrumental performance is as great as one would expect, and Akerfeldt's vocals are again amazing. Top quality sections just flow throughout the album, making it truly -excellent-. My Arms, Your Hearse is a indeed a brilliant proof that Swedish metal isn't entirely stagnant." Tartarean Desires critic Cseke Róbert wrote, "this record is more powerful and more beautiful than most of today's music from this genre. The entire record is a mixture of hell-bound adrenalin and soul... My Arms, Your Hearse is such a powerful album that I consider it one of the best of the genre." Demonic Tutor (Olivier Espiau) of Metal Storm stated the album is a "trip to heaven" and also:

Tim Henderson of Brave Words & Bloody Knuckles said "you are in for a treat, easily described as the black metal version of The Dark Side of the Moon in all its pride and glory. In fact, if Gilmour joined Emperor, or if Cradle took sides with Yes, can My Arms, Your Hearse be truly described". "My Arms, Your Hearse is a milestone in '90s extreme metal", wrote Chris Bruni in his review for Unrestrained! magazine. He also wrote that the album is "easily their most stunning achievement" and "the songs are stronger, heavier, more cohesive, with a stronger sound courtesy of Studio Fredman, and the textures and song movements are some of the best executed structures to be heard in metal".

Track listing

Personnel
Credits for My Arms, Your Hearse adapted from liner notes.Opeth Mikael Åkerfeldt – vocals, guitars, bass, piano
 Peter Lindgren – guitars, photography
 Martin Lopez – drumsProduction'''
 Fredrik Nordström – engineering, mixing, Hammond organ on "Epilogue"
 Anders Fridén – engineering
 Göran Finnberg – mastering
 Tom Martinsen – graphic design

Release history
This is the second Opeth album with a major delayed release (the first being Orchid) and the recording for My Arms, Your Hearse was done a year before its release, just like Orchid. My Arms, Your Hearse was released on 18 August 1998 simultaneously in Europe and the United States on CD by Candlelight Records and Century Black, respectively. It was released in Poland by Mystic Production on cassette. The album was reissued in 2000 on CD by Candlelight Records and on LP by Displeased Records. The LP was limited to 1,000 copies. These reissues contain two bonus tracks, "Circle of the Tyrants" and "Remember Tomorrow".Opeth: My Arms, Your Hearse . Opeth.com. Retrieved July 9, 2011. They are covers of songs that were only previously available on two separate tribute albums, In Memory of Celtic Frost and A Call to Irons: A Tribute to Iron Maiden'', respectively. A special edition was released by Candlelight in 2003.

References

1998 albums
Albums produced by Fredrik Nordström
Albums recorded at Studio Fredman
Candlelight Records albums
Century Media Records albums
Concept albums
Opeth albums